André Cognat, also known as Antecume, (21 February 1938 – 15 October 2021) was the French Guinean chief of a Wayana tribe in Antecume Pata, French Guiana, France.

Early life
André Cognat was born on 21 February 1938 in Pierre-Bénite near Lyon, in metropolitan France.

Adult life
Cognat moved to French Guiana in 1961, at the age of 23. His boat capsized on the Litani near Maripasoula, and he was rescued by a Wayana from the Amazonia. Cognat decided to stay there, and he married a Wayana woman called Alasawani in 1973; they had a son and a daughter. By 1985, he took the name of Antecume. He also founded a new settlement called Antecume Pata, and he became the chief of the local Wayana tribe.

Cognat founded Yepe, a non-profit organization to protect the rights of the Wayanas, in 1990. In particular, he had interceded for them in Cayenne to retain their access to water against Brazilian gold dredgers.

Cognat is the author of two memoirs about his life as a tribal chief.

Death
Cognat died on 15 October 2021 at the age of 83 at his home in Antecume Pata, French Guiana, France.

Works

References

1938 births
2021 deaths
People from Lyon
20th-century French memoirists
20th-century French male writers
French male non-fiction writers
French Guianan writers
Wayana people